The 2022 FAO Super Cup will be the second edition of the FAO Super Cup, the main club knockout football competition of Odisha, India. The competition will start on 11 September 2022 and end on 18 September 2022. The entire tournament is scheduled to take place at one venue i.e. the CRRI Ground in Cuttack. Due to the COVID-19 pandemic in India, the Super Cup hasn't been organised since 2018, and hence this edition will only be the second edition of the Super Cup, after its inaugural 2018 edition.

The competition features teams from the Silver, Gold and Diamond competitions of the FAO League, the premier state level football league in Odisha, India. The top four teams from the Diamond League, top three from Silver League, and the winners of the Silver League qualify for the tournament.

Teams
A total of 8 teams will participate in the competition. From FAO League, the top four teams from the Diamond Division, three from the Gold Division, and the winner of Silver Division play-off will qualify for the tournament.

Dates

Quarter-finals

Semi-finals

Final

See also
 2022 FAO League
 2019 FAO League
 2018 FAO Super Cup
 FAO League
 FAO Super Cup
 FAO Women's League
 Football Association of Odisha
 Odisha football team
 Odisha women's football team

References

2022–23 in Indian football
FAO Super Cup